Kosmos 93 ( meaning Cosmos 93), also known as DS-U2-V No.1, was a Soviet satellite which was launched in 1965 as part of the Dnepropetrovsk Sputnik programme. It was a  spacecraft, which was built by the Yuzhnoye Design Bureau, and was used to conduct classified technology development experiments for the Soviet armed forces.

A Kosmos-2M 63S1M carrier rocket was used to launch Kosmos 93 into low Earth orbit. The launch took place from Site 86/1 at Kapustin Yar. The launch occurred at 05:45 GMT on 19 October 1965, and resulted in the successful insertion of the satellite into orbit. Upon reaching orbit, the satellite was assigned its Kosmos designation, and received the International Designator 1965-084A. The North American Air Defense Command assigned it the catalogue number 01629.

Kosmos 93 was the first of four DS-U2-V satellites to be launched. On 3 January 1966, it decayed from orbit and reentered the atmosphere.

See also

 1965 in spaceflight

References

Spacecraft launched in 1965
Kosmos satellites
Dnepropetrovsk Sputnik program